Northport is a city in Tuscaloosa County in the west central part of the State of Alabama. Located on the Black Warrior River across from downtown Tuscaloosa, it is currently the 21st largest city in Alabama with an estimated population of 26,115 in 2019. It incorporated in 1871. It is part of the Tuscaloosa Metropolitan Statistical Area.

Geography
As Northport is adjacent to the larger city of Tuscaloosa, many residents work in Tuscaloosa or other parts of Tuscaloosa County. Although the two cities share a land boundary, much of their boundary (and historically all of the boundary) is the Black Warrior River. The cities of Tuscaloosa and Northport grew at the historical head of navigation at the fall line between the Appalachian Highlands (specifically, the Cumberland Plateau) and the Gulf Coastal Plain, with Northport on the north bank of the river. 

Demographics

At the 2000 census, there were 19,435 people, 7,844 households, and 5,255 families living in the city. The racial makeup of the city was 71.11% White, 26.03% Black or African American, 0.19% Native American, 0.80% Asian, 0.15% Pacific Islander, 1.02% from other races, and 0.70% from two or more races. 1.92% of the population were Hispanic or Latino of any race.

Of the 7,844 households 32.8% had children under the age of 18 living with them, 48.3% were married couples living together, 15.7% had a female householder with no husband present, and 33.0% were non-families. 28.6% of households were one person and 9.7% were one person aged 65 or older. The average household size was 2.41 and the average family size was 2.98.

The age distribution was 24.9% under the age of 18, 10.5% from 18 to 24, 29.3% from 25 to 44, 21.3% from 45 to 64, and 14.1% 65 or older. The median age was 35 years. For every 100 females, there were 83.9 males. For every 100 females age 18 and over, there were 79.6 males.

The median household income was $40,206 and the median family income  was $48,673. Males had a median income of $41,008 versus $26,340 for females. The per capita income for the city was $20,163. About 11.6% of families and 13.9% of the population were below the poverty line, including 20.4% of those under age 18 and 10.6% of those age 65 or over.

2010 census
At the 2010 census, there were 23,330 people, 9,430 households, and 6,060 families living in the city. The racial makeup of the city was 68.4% White, 26.9% Black or African American, 0.3% Native American, 1.1% Asian, 0.3% Pacific Islander, 2.0% from other races, and 1.1% from two or more races. 4.1% of the population were Hispanic or Latino of any race.

Of the 9,430 households 29.3% had children under the age of 18 living with them, 45.2% were married couples living together, 15.3% had a female householder with no husband present, and 35.7% were non-families. 29.6% of households were one person and 9.6% were one person aged 65 or older. The average household size was 2.40 and the average family size was 2.99.

The age distribution was 23.4% under the age of 18, 10.6% from 18 to 24, 29.0% from 25 to 44, 23.0% from 45 to 64, and 14.0% 65 or older. The median age was 34.8 years. For every 100 females, there were 87.0 males. For every 100 females age 18 and over, there were 90.6 males.

The median household income was $49,167 and the median family income  was $68,017. Males had a median income of $51,660 versus $36,566 for females. The per capita income for the city was $23,571. About 8.0% of families and 15.4% of the population were below the poverty line, including 14.4% of those under age 18 and 9.9% of those age 65 or over.

Culture

One of Northport's cultural activities is the Kentuck Festival of the Arts. Each October, artists gather at Kentuck Park to showcase their work in front of visitors. The festival celebrates folk and contemporary art as well as traditional crafts. Potters, quilters, and basketmakers offer educational craft demonstrations throughout the weekend.

A tradition of Northport is Art Night, which is held on the first Thursday of each month. Many of Northport's art galleries open their doors after hours for this event and art or craft demonstrations are offered. A bus system runs between downtown Northport and downtown Tuscaloosa as a collaboration with Tuscaloosa's Art and Soul event.

Dickens Downtown is held the first Tuesday in December. This annual holiday event attracts participants to come and see the period setting of 19th-century England.

The Northport Heritage Museum houses a collection of artifacts and photographs that documents the history and evolution of the city.

Notable people
Hannah Brown (born 1994), American model, television personality, and beauty pageant titleholder
Frank Lary (1930–2017), American baseball player
Le'Ron McClain (born 1984), American football player
Curley Hallman, American Football Coach
Evan Bush, Top G

References

External links
 Official City Homepage
 Kentuck Festival of the Arts
 Friends of Historic Northport/Northport Heritage Museum

Cities in Alabama
Cities in Tuscaloosa County, Alabama
Tuscaloosa, Alabama metropolitan area